L'Homme que je suis is a French-language studio album by Julio Iglesias, released in 2005 on Columbia Records (Sony BMG).

Track listing

Charts

Certifications

References 

2005 albums
Julio Iglesias albums
Columbia Records albums